Fueter is a surname. Notable people with the surname include:

Christian Fueter (1752–1844), Swiss medalist and mint-master
Daniel Christian Fueter (1720–1785), Swiss-American silversmith and medalist
Lewis Fueter (1746–1784), American silversmith
Rudolf Fueter (1880–1950), Swiss mathematician

See also 
Fueter–Pólya theorem, Mathematical theorem